Bon Air is a neighborhood in eastern Louisville, Kentucky, United States.  Its boundaries are I-264 to the north, Bardstown Road to the west, Furman Boulevard to the east, and subdivisions to the south.  The earliest residential development was the Wellingmoor subdivision in 1939, laid out by Ralph Drake.  Growth picked up after World War II, but was broken up somewhat by the construction of the Watterson Expressway in the late 1940s.

Education
Bon Air has a lending library, a branch of the Louisville Free Public Library.

References

External links
Street map of Bon Air
Bon Air Neighborhood Association
Bon Air Nextdoor page (registration required)
   Images of Bon Air (Louisville, Ky.) in the University of Louisville Libraries Digital Collections

Neighborhoods in Louisville, Kentucky
Populated places established in 1939
1939 establishments in Kentucky